Every Night's a Saturday Night is the fifth studio album by American country music artist Lee Roy Parnell. It was released via Career Records, a sister label of Arista Nashville, on June 17, 1997. The album includes the singles "Lucky Me, Lucky You", "You Can't Get There from Here" and "All that Matters Anymore", which respectively reached #35, #39 and #50 on Billboard Hot Country Songs. Parnell produced the album with his band, The Hot Links.

Also included on this album are "Better Word for Love", originally recorded by NRBQ on their 1994 album Message for the Mess Age, and "Honky Tonk Night Time Man", originally recorded by Merle Haggard on 1974's Merle Haggard Presents His 30th Album.

Track listing

Personnel
As listed in liner notes.

The Hot Links
Steven Mackey – bass guitar, fretless bass, bull fiddle, background vocals
Kevin McKendree – piano, Hammond B-3 organ
Lee Roy Parnell – electric guitar, slide guitar, National guitar
James Pennebaker – electric guitar, pedal steel guitar, mandolin, background vocals
Lynn Williams – drums, percussion

Additional musicians
Al Anderson – acoustic guitar
Billy Joe Walker, Jr. – acoustic guitar, gut string guitar

Background vocals
Guy Clark
Jonell Mosser
Harry Stinson
John Wesley Ryles
Dennis Wilson
Trisha Yearwood

Strings
Carl Gorodetzky
Bob Mason
Pam Sixfin
Gary Vanosdale
Kris Wilkinson

Strings conducted and arranged by Carl Marsh.

Chart performance

References

1997 albums
Arista Records albums
Lee Roy Parnell albums